SpongeBob SquarePants: Employee of the Month is a 2002 point-and-click adventure video game developed by AWE Games and published by THQ for Microsoft Windows. It is based on the television show SpongeBob SquarePants, which premiered on Nickelodeon in 1999.

The story focuses on SpongeBob SquarePants receiving two tickets to Neptune's Paradise, a theme park, but many unexpected things happen along the way.

Gameplay
Employee of the Month is a point-and-click adventure game in which the player controls SpongeBob SquarePants. Gameplay consists of the player accomplishing various tasks and collecting items for citizens of Bikini Bottom. A treasure chest acts as an inventory for the player's items, which frequently must be combined to proceed forward. The player can also access a map of the current chapter. Animated cutscenes begin and end each level, and subsequently become available for viewing on the game's main menu. Several videotapes are hidden throughout the game; locating them unlocks special footage of the game's development.

Story 
The story focuses on SpongeBob "winning" two tickets to Neptune's Paradise, a theme park. But along the way many unexpected things happen, such as a storm hitting while on the bus to Neptune's Paradise and sending them into Rock Bottom.

Intro
SpongeBob, an employee of the Krusty Krab restaurant, wins the "Employee of the Month" award again, making him "Employee of the Year". As a prize, he receives two tickets to Neptune's Paradise, a local theme park which Mr. Krabs had won free tickets to in the mail.

Chapter 1: Employee of the Year 
After receiving the tickets to Neptune's Paradise, SpongeBob first serves a Krabby Patty for a grumpy customer and then is informed by the customer how to get to the park; to take a bus there. After his shift at the Krusty Krab is over, SpongeBob heads downtown where he meets Patrick to board the bus. Unfortunately, SpongeBob does not have money for bus tokens. SpongeBob goes to Goo Lagoon, the local beach, to find the Flying Dutchman's buried treasure to pay for tokens. After SpongeBob completes a series of tasks for various characters, he finds the Flying Dutchman's treasure, which is a chest entirely full of bus tokens. After SpongeBob completes several more tasks in order to convince a bus driver to agree to take them, he and Patrick depart for Neptune's Paradise.

Chapter 2: Hitting Rock Bottom 
SpongeBob and Patrick, end up in Rock Bottom due to heavy rain, and the bus driver gets upset with SpongeBob and Patrick for getting him trapped there. He refuses to help SpongeBob any further until the weather clears up and SpongeBob gets left on his own. SpongeBob eventually learns that the rainstorm is being caused by Marlin the wizard, who is upset at a local weatherman for wanting to build a machine that can control the weather. Marlin feels threatened by the machine since controlling the weather is his job. After SpongeBob and Patrick destroy the weather machine, Marlin stops the rain and the pair continue their travel to Neptune's Paradise. However, the bus driver gets irritated more than he can handle with SpongeBob and Patrick's childish antics and eventually tricks them into getting off the bus back in Bikini Bottom before he drives away.

Chapter 3: Back to Square One 
Just as SpongeBob was about to give up, Patrick remembers that that Sandy was building a rocket inside her treedome that can take them to Neptune's Paradise. SpongeBob to tackles numerous challenges so as to prepare for the flight. SpongeBob needs his water helmet to enter Sandy's treedome. When he finds a sea snake in the helmet, he decides to use Squidward's clarinet to lure it out. However, Squidward is in a deep sleep, so SpongeBob uses a pair of Dream Glasses to enter his dreams, where he is partially transformed into Squidward himself. SpongeBob convinces Squidward to give him the clarinet, which SpongeBob uses to retrieve his water helmet from the sea snake. The gang then sets off again for Neptune's Paradise, but unbeknownst to them, Patrick accidentally breaks the oxygen pipe before the rocket tanks are completely filled.

Chapter 4: Bottoms Up! 
Sandy's rocket crashes in the affluent town of Bottoms Up. SpongeBob then embarks on a search for oxygen fuel for the rocket, leading him on a quest to complete various tasks. Sandy instructs SpongeBob to get oxygen at Oxygen Springs Resort and Spa where geysers are used as hot-tubs but with bubbles of oxygen. However, the intercom denies SpongeBob access to the springs on the grounds that SpongeBob is not wearing a jacket. So the pivotal point of this chapter is SpongeBob must find a jacket from somewhere to get into the springs. Meanwhile, Patrick searches for a bathroom after eating junk food in the previous chapters. After a series of tasks to get his jacket, SpongeBob ends up traveling to a small wealthy city, Waverly Hills where he finds himself at a very fancy seafood restaurant inside of the wreck of the Titanic. SpongeBob receives a loaned jacket at the restaurant but is then kicked out after he accidentally reveals that he is from Bikini Bottom, a town that the waiters of the restaurant dislike. Luckily, the waiter forgets to take back SpongeBob's jacket. After successfully getting into the Springs, and refilling the oxygen tanks, they leave for Neptune's Paradise.

Finale 
The gang finally gets to Neptune's Paradise, but an employee tells them that the park is closed for a private party. SpongeBob and Patrick show their tickets, but the employee reveals the tickets are for next week, which saddens the pair, however, the employee also reveals that it is their party, and they are allowed to enter. Inside the park, they meet all of the characters they met along the way, who seemed to have planned this for SpongeBob. They all then enjoy the rides and attractions.

Cast
 Tom Kenny as SpongeBob SquarePants
 Bill Fagerbakke as Patrick Star
 Carolyn Lawrence as Sandy Cheeks
 Rodger Bumpass as Squidward Tentacles
 Doug Lawrence as Plankton and Larry the Lobster
 Tim Conway as Barnacle Boy
 Marion Ross as Grandma SquarePants
 Clancy Brown as Mr. Krabs
 Joe Whyte as Mermaid Man
 Brian Doyle-Murray as Flying Dutchman

Release
The game was released in North America on September 22, 2002, and in the UK in the same year. Focus Multimedia later re-published the game in the UK as part of their "PC Fun Club" range which also includes other SpongeBob SquarePants games.

Reception
Tom King of Adventure Gamers rated the game 3 out of 5, and praised its fun gameplay and colorful graphics, but also called it, "Very easy, and extremely short." King wrote, "The replay value is moderate to low; it took some 3.5 hours for me to complete, and although the game is certainly fun enough to play more than once, you're not going to see anything different. Were this game just a little longer, I would add a half-star to the score."

The editors of Computer Gaming World nominated SpongeBob SquarePants: Employee of the Month for their 2003 "Adventure Game of the Year" award, which ultimately went to Uplink: Hacker Elite.

References

External links
 
 SpongeBob SquarePants: Employee of the Month walkthroughs from IGN

2002 video games
Adventure games
Employee of the Month
THQ games
Windows games
Windows-only games
Video games developed in the United States
Single-player video games
Point-and-click adventure games
Focus Multimedia games